Smok Kaszubski ("Kashubian Dragon") was an improvised Polish armoured train, which served in the Polish defenses during the German invasion in 1939. The train was part of the Land Coastal Defence.

The train was built in September 1939, at the initiative of Kapitan
marynarki Jerzy Błeszyński, by employees of the workshop of the naval port in Gdynia. For the construction of the steel plates, steel from the hulls of unfinished destroyers Orkan and Huragan was used. The first commander of the train was Kapitan Błeszyński. After his injury on 9 September 1939 in Wejherowo, command of the train was taken over by Porucznik
marynarki Florian Hubicki. 

The operating personnel of the train was mostly formed by the Gdynian railways workers and sailors from the former company servicing the port.

Composition of the train:
- 1 × tank locomotive OKl27 armoured with steel plates
- 2 × armoured cars for troops
- 2 × battle cars  

Armor:
9mm high-tensile steel all-around the engine and cars' sides
6mm steel cars' roofs

Armament:
- 1 × Vickers 40mm AA gun, taken from ORP Mazur
- 1 × 47 mm Hotchkiss gun, formerly a saluting gun on ORP Bałtyk
- 11 × machine guns
- 30 × small arms from ORP Wicher

See also 
List of armoured trains

Armoured trains of Poland